Triolena asplundii is a species of plant in the family Melastomataceae. It is endemic to Ecuador.

References

Endemic flora of Ecuador
asplundii
Endangered plants
Taxonomy articles created by Polbot